BOL Network  is a media conglomerate based in Karachi owned by Shoaib Ahmed Shaikh who also served as the CEO and chairman of the media network. According to Declan Walsh Bol Network was under the auspices of the fake diploma mill Axact. The media group was supposed to incorporate television, digital media, cinema and theater as well as digital media, but when the parent company of Bol, Axact, was unmasked as a diploma mill selling fake degrees Pakistan Electronic Media Regulatory Authority revoked the licence that it had awarded BOL, and the network was not even able to start transmission. Pakistani journalist Kamran Khan was appointed as the editor in chief, but he quit after the Axact scandal surfaced and stated that his conscience did not let him be affiliated with such a network.

Bol News launched regular live transmissions on 18 October 2016.

The Pakistan Electronic Media Regulatory Authority revoked its license on September 5, 2022 due to the channel failing to acquire security clearance. Following a Sindh High Court order, the channel resumed transmissions two days later, with its managers condemning PEMRA for the channel's abrupt suspension.

History
The BOL Network was started by Pakistani businessman Shoaib Ahmed Sheikh in June 2013, and according to him, it was meant to create an independent media house to portray a soft image of Pakistan and several notable journalists joined the network at that time.

Bol TV claims to be on the Centrist/Left of Centre of the political spectrum but with a strong pro-nationalist outlook.

It claims to have offered insurance of up to Rs. 10 million to cable operators. In 2014, BOL Network advertised on more than 20,000 public transport vehicles in Pakistan. The company also announced a television set brand by the name of BG. The Bol Entertainment is also a project of the Bol.

Media personnel 
During the early phases of Bol, many prominent media personnel joined the network. These included Nabeel Zafar, Zeba Shehnaz and Haider Imam Rizvi who joined the entertainment channel. Kamran Khan, Mubasher Lucman, Faysal Aziz Khan, Jasmeen Manzoor and Iftikhar Ahmed were reportedly a part of the Bol News channel.

Channels

Bol Network operates the following channels:

 Bol News - Ultra HD  – 24-Hour Urdu News Channel (launched on 18 October 2016)
 Bol Entertainment - Ultra HD  – 24-Hour Entertainment Channel (launched on 1 December 2018)
 PAK - Ultra HD  – 24-Hour News & Entertainment (launched in 2017 and shut down in 2019)

Upcoming channels

 Bol Sports - Ultra HD - 24-Hour Sports Channel (coming soon)
 Bol Music - Ultra HD - 24-Hour Music Channel (coming soon)
 Bol Movies- Ultra HD - 24-Hour Hollywood Movies English Language Channel (coming soon)
 Bol Films - Ultra HD - 24-Hour International Films Dubbing in Urdu and Pakistani Films Channel (coming soon)
 Bol Cricket - Ultra HD - 24-Hour Cricket Channel (coming soon)
 Bol World - Ultra HD - 24-Hour English News Channel (coming soon)
 Bol English - Ultra HD - 24-Hour international Drama and Series  English Language Channel (coming soon)
 Bol News International - Ultra HD - 24-Hour International Beam Broadcast in UK, USA, ME (coming soon)
 Bol Entertainment International - Ultra HD - 24-Hour International Beam Broadcast in UK, USA, ME (coming soon)
 Pak News - Ultra HD - 24-Hour Urdu Language News Channel (coming soon)
 Pak Entertainment - Ultra HD - 24-Hour Urdu Language Entertainment Channel (coming soon)

Bol broadcasters

 Bol Radio 24 Hour Radio Station in Karachi- (coming soon)

Bol publication

 Bol Narrative Magazine (English Magazine, launch 2016)
 Roznama Bol (Urdu News Paper, coming soon)
 Daily Bol (English News Paper, coming soon)
 Bol Magazine (Urdu Magazine, coming soon)

Television and drama

 Bol Network own is TV & Drama Production House in Karachi (coming soon)

Movies and films

 Bol own is film distribution company in Karachi and film production company in Karachi (coming soon)

Stage theater 

 Bol Plane Launch own theater company in Karachi.
 BOL Digital

Bol has 680+ channels, profiles and pages in 16 languages worldwide.

Locations
The head office is located in Karachi and called Bolistan  The network's regional headquarters in the provinces are in Lahore and Islamabad. BOL Network, also operated their own DSNG vans and when the parent company, Axact, was raided by FBR in connection with fake degrees and money laundering, Bol Network used its DSNG vans to create a barricade and prevent journalists from coming near the building. When the Axact scandal came to light reliable sources informed the Federal Board of Revenue that most of the equipment used by Bol network had been imported illegally. A notice was served to the CEO under Section 26 of the Customs Act 1969 and he was ordered to submit proof that the equipment being used had been imported using legal means.

Programs

Controversies

Axact Scandal

Initial raids and indictments 
On 17 May 2015, The New York Times published an investigative story reporting that Axact ran at least 370 degree and accreditation mill websites. When Axact offices were raided by the FIA at the interior minister's orders, many compromising documents were recovered, including fake letterhead of the US State Department. Subsequently, Axact was sealed on 28 May 2015, and the Information ministry requested PEMRA to close down BOL. On 26 May 2015, Federal Investigation Agency arrested Shoaib Ahmed Shaikh for investigation. The case was filed against him on 27 May 2015, in Karachi, Pakistan. The same day he was ordered to submit "copy of the letter of credit, contract or proof of payment in support of the transactions and the source of financing for the procurement of the imported goods" as the FBR had received intelligence that Bol was using illegal equipment. on 5 June 2015, Ayesha Sheikh, the wife of Bol CEO Shoib Sheikh was indicted on charges of money laundering in connected with Axact and Bol.

Resignation of media personnel 
Bol was aggressive in recruiting media personnel when the network was in development. However, when it came to light that the network was being run through illegal means and was part of a scam they were quick to leave. While Kamran Khan tweeted that his conscience would not let him continue, Iftikhar Ahmad wrote "cannot work for an organisation whose basic workings conflict with my professional commitment." Asma Shirazi resigned and posted on Twitter, "I have resigned from Bol News. Truth must prevail."

Post Axact Scandal Acquisition 
After the suspension of the BOL Network and BOL News there was a mass exodus of journalists and other media personnel from the company. However ARY Digital Network CEO Salman Iqbal offered to take over the beleaguered company in August 2015. He stated that the decision had been taken in view to provide career protection to media industry and its workers. The founder of ARY Group said that his media group would launch the transmission of the channel within three weeks. On 30 September 2015, it was announced that the deal between the owners of BOL and ARY Digital Network had fallen through.

Denial of access to Axact databases 
Both Bol and Axact have been petitioning to be granted access to databases maintained by Axact. However FIA declined to allow them access. On 12 April 2016 the Supreme court of Pakistan rejected the plea entered by Bol and Axact administration which requested that they be granted access to their databases and offices. The three judges of the bench observed that such access will not be provided until the investigation into the diploma mill scams, forgery and other allegations has been completed.

Inter-Services Intelligence connection
On 15 October 2013, the Hindustan Times reported that the entry of BOL media electronic player was backed by the ISI, which sparked controversy. Later a corrigendum (an error in a printed work discovered after printing and shown with its correction on a separate sheet) was issued by Hindustan Times.

Ishaq Dar legal trouble
Ishaq Dar sent legal notice to BOL for airing program to defame him.

See also 
 Aisay Nahi Chalay Ga
List of news channels in Pakistan
Faysal Aziz Khan
List of 4K channels in Pakistan

References

External links

 
Mass media companies of Pakistan
Axact
Television stations in Karachi
Television channels and stations established in 2013
24-hour television news channels in Pakistan
Television stations in Pakistan